John Symon Asher "Jack" Bruce (14 May 1943 – 25 October 2014) was a Scottish singer, songwriter, musician and composer. He gained popularity as the primary lead vocalist and ‍bassist ‍of British rock band Cream. After the group disbanded in 1968, he pursued a solo career and also played with several bands.

In the early 1960s Bruce joined the Graham Bond Organisation (GBO), where he met his future bandmate Ginger Baker. After leaving the band, he joined with John Mayall & the Bluesbreakers, where he met Eric Clapton, who also became his future bandmate. His time with the band was brief. In 1966, he formed Cream with lead guitarist Clapton and drummer Baker; he co-wrote many of their songs (including "Sunshine of Your Love", "White Room" and "I Feel Free") with poet/lyricist Pete Brown. After the group disbanded in the late 1960s he began recording solo albums. Bruce formed his own band to perform the material live, and subsequently formed the blues rock band West, Bruce and Laing in 1972, with ex- Mountain guitarist Leslie West and drummer Corky Laing. His solo career spanned several decades. From the 1970s to the 1990s he played with several bands as a touring member. He reunited with Cream in 2005 for concerts at the Royal Albert Hall and at Madison Square Garden in New York.

Bruce is considered to be one of the most important and influential ‍bassists ‍of all time. ‍Rolling Stone magazine readers ranked him number eight on their list of "10 ‍Greatest ‍Bassists ‍Of All Time". He was inducted in the Rock and Roll Hall of Fame in 1993, and was awarded the Grammy Lifetime Achievement Award in 2006, both as a member of Cream.

Life and career

1943–1962: Early life
Bruce was born on 14 May 1943 in Bishopbriggs, Lanarkshire, Scotland, to Betty (née Asher) and Charlie Bruce, musical parents who moved frequently, resulting in the young Bruce attending 14 different schools, ending up at Bellahouston Academy. He began playing jazz bass in his teens and won a scholarship to study cello and musical composition at the Royal Scottish Academy of Music and Drama while playing in Jim McHarg's Scotsville Jazzband to support himself.

1962–1966: Early career
After leaving school, he toured Italy, playing double bass with the Murray Campbell Big Band. 

In 1962, Bruce became a member of the London-based band Blues Incorporated, led by Alexis Korner, in which he played the upright bass. The band also included organist Graham Bond, saxophonist Dick Heckstall-Smith and drummer Ginger Baker. In 1963 the group broke up, and Bruce went on to form the Graham Bond Quartet with Bond, Baker and guitarist John McLaughlin. They played an eclectic range of music genres, including bebop, blues and rhythm and blues. As a result of session work, Bruce switched from the upright bass to the electric bass guitar. The move to electric bass happened as McLaughlin was dropped from the band; he was replaced by Heckstall-Smith on saxophone, and the band pursued a more concise R&B sound and changed their name to the Graham Bond Organisation. The group released two studio albums and several singles but were not commercially successful.

During the time that Bruce and Baker played with the Graham Bond Organisation, they were known for their hostility towards each other. There were numerous stories of the two sabotaging each other's equipment and fighting on stage. Relations grew so bad between the two that Bruce left the band in August 1965. 

After leaving, Bruce recorded a solo single, "I'm Gettin Tired", for Polydor Records. He joined John Mayall and his Bluesbreakers band, which featured guitarist Eric Clapton. Bruce's stay in the band was brief, and he did not contribute to any releases at the time, but recordings featuring him were later released, initially on Looking Back and Primal Solos.

After the Bluesbreakers, Bruce had his first commercial success as a member of Manfred Mann in 1966, including "Pretty Flamingo", which reached number one in the UK singles chart (one of two number one records of his career – the other being an uncredited bass part on The Scaffold's "Lily the Pink") as well as the freewheeling and groundbreaking jazz rock of Instrumental Asylum. When interviewed on the edition of the VH1 show Classic Albums which featured Disraeli Gears, Mayall said that Bruce had been lured away by the lucrative commercial success of Manfred Mann, while Mann himself recalled that Bruce played his first gig with the band without any rehearsal, playing the songs straight through without error, commenting that perhaps the chord changes seemed obvious to Bruce.

While with Manfred Mann, Bruce again collaborated with Clapton as a member of Powerhouse, which also featured Spencer Davis Group vocalist Steve Winwood, credited as "Steve Anglo". Three tracks were featured on the Elektra sampler album What's Shakin'. Two of the songs, "Crossroads" and "Steppin' Out", became staples in the live set of his next band, Cream.

1966–1968: Cream

In July 1966, Bruce, Eric Clapton and Ginger Baker founded the power trio Cream, which gained international recognition playing blues-rock and jazz-inflected rock music. Bruce sang most of the lead vocals, with Clapton backing him up and eventually assuming some leads himself.

With his Gibson EB-3 electric bass, Bruce became one of the most famous bassists in rock, winning musicians' polls and influencing the next generation of bassists such as Sting, Jim Shaw, Geddy Lee, Geezer Butler and Jeff Berlin. Bruce co-wrote most of Cream's single releases with lyricist Pete Brown, including the hits "Sunshine of Your Love", "White Room" and "I Feel Free". Cream broke up in 1968.

1970s: Post-Cream
Collaborative efforts with musicians, in many genres – hard rock, jazz, blues, R&B, fusion, avant-garde, world music, third stream classical – continued as a theme of Bruce's career. Alongside these he produced a long line of highly regarded solo albums. In contrast to his collaborative works, the solo albums usually maintain a common theme: melodic songs with a complex musical structure, songs with lyrics frequently penned by Pete Brown and a core band of world-class musicians. This structure was loosened on his live solo albums and DVDs, where extended improvisations similar to those employed by Cream in live performance were sometimes still used.

In August 1968, before Cream officially disbanded, Bruce recorded a semi-acoustic free jazz album with John McLaughlin, Dick Heckstall-Smith and Jon Hiseman. This was issued in 1970 as Bruce's second solo album, Things We Like. The album was a precursor to the jazz fusion boom in the early 1970s, and more recently has been sampled by hip hop artists including Artifacts and Smif-N-Wessun.

Bruce's first solo release, Songs for a Tailor, was issued in September 1969; it too featured Heckstall-Smith and Hiseman. It was a worldwide hit, but after a brief supporting tour backed by Larry Coryell and Mitch Mitchell, Bruce joined the jazz fusion group Lifetime, with drummer Tony Williams, guitarist McLaughlin, and organist Larry Young, for its second album, Turn It Over (1970). For the group's third album, Ego (1971), Ron Carter replaced Bruce on bass, but Bruce contributed a guest vocal. Bruce then recorded his third solo album Harmony Row, but this was not as commercially successful as Songs for a Tailor. The song "The Consul at Sunset" from Harmony Row, which was inspired by the Malcolm Lowry novel Under the Volcano, was released as a single in 1971 (Polydor 2058–153, b/w "A Letter of Thanks"), but did not chart.

In 1972 Bruce formed a blues rock power trio, West, Bruce & Laing. Besides Bruce, the group included singer/guitarist Leslie West and drummer Corky Laing, both formerly of the Cream-influenced American band Mountain. West, Bruce & Laing produced two studio albums, Why Dontcha and Whatever Turns You On, and one live album, Live 'n' Kickin'.

The band's breakup was announced shortly before Live 'n' Kickins release in early 1974, and Bruce released his fourth solo album Out of the Storm later that year. Also in 1974 he featured on the title track of Frank Zappa's album Apostrophe ('), recorded in November 1972. Bruce was credited with bass and co-authorship on the improvised track. When asked about Zappa in a 1992 interview, Bruce tried to change the subject and jokingly insisted that he had played only cello parts. Outtakes from the session were released on the archival release The Crux Of The Biscuit in 2016. In 1973 Bruce recorded bass guitar for Lou Reed's Berlin album, playing on all but two tracks.

A 1975 tour was lined up to support the Out of the Storm album with a band featuring former Rolling Stones guitarist Mick Taylor and jazz keyboard player Carla Bley, with whom he had collaborated in 1971 on Escalator over the Hill. The tour was belatedly documented on Live at Manchester Free Trade Hall '75 (2003), but it ended with Taylor's departure, and sessions for a studio album were abandoned. During the next year, Bruce only resurfaced to play on Charlie Mariano's Helen 12 Trees album.

In 1976, Bruce formed a new band (The Jack Bruce Band) with drummer Simon Phillips and keyboardist Tony Hymas. The group recorded an album, called How's Tricks. A world tour followed, but the album was a commercial failure. The follow-up album, Jet Set Jewel, was rejected at the time by Bruce's record label RSO as not being marketable, and RSO ultimately dropped Bruce from their roster. In 1979 he toured with members from the Mahavishnu Orchestra, reuniting him with John McLaughlin, and introducing him to drummer Billy Cobham. A 3-CD collection of his 1970s BBC recordings, entitled Spirit, was released in 2008.

1980s
By 1979, Bruce's drug habit had reached such a level that he had lost most of his money. Bruce contributed as a session musician to recordings by Cozy Powell, Gary Moore and Jon Anderson to raise money. By 1980 his career was back on track with his new band, Jack Bruce & Friends, consisting of drummer Billy Cobham, guitarist Clem Clempson and keyboardist/guitarist David Sancious. After releasing an album, I've Always Wanted to Do This, at the end of 1980, they undertook a long tour to support the record, but it was not a commercial success and they disbanded. In the early 1980s, he also joined up to play with friends from his Alexis Korner days in Rocket 88, the back-to-the-roots band that Ian Stewart had arranged, and Bruce appears on the album of the same name, recorded live in Germany in 1980. They also recorded a "live in the studio" album called Blues & Boogie Explosion for the German audiophile record label Jeton. That year he also collaborated on the Soft Machine album Land of Cockayne (1981).

In 1981, Bruce collaborated with guitarist Robin Trower and released two power trio albums, B.L.T. and Truce, the first of which was a minor hit in the US. By 1983, Bruce was no longer contracted to a major record company and released his next solo album, Automatic, on a minor German label, Intercord. A European tour followed to promote the album enlisting Bruce Gary from the Knack (who had also played in Bruce's 1975 band) on drums and Sancious from his 1980 band (Jack Bruce & Friends) on guitar and keyboards. In 1982, Bruce played with a short-lived ensemble A Gathering of Minds, composed of Billy Cobham, Allan Holdsworth, Didier Lockwood and David Sancious at Montreux. In 1983, Bruce sang on tracks 5 and 6 of the Allan Holdsworth album Road Games.

In 1983, Bruce began working with the Latin/world music producer Kip Hanrahan, and released the collaborative albums Desire Develops an Edge, Vertical's Currency, A Few Short Notes from the End Run, Exotica and All Roads Are Made of the Flesh. They were all critically successful, and in 2001 he went on to form his own band using Hanrahan's famous Cuban rhythm section. Other than his partnership with lyricist Pete Brown, Bruce's musical relationship with Hanrahan was the most consistent and long-lasting of his career.

In 1985, he sang lead and played blues harp on the song "Silver Bullet" with Anton Fier's Golden Palominos. It appears on the album Visions of Excess. In 1986 he re-recorded the Cream song "I Feel Free" and released it as a single to support an advertising campaign for the Renault 21 motor car.

In 1989, Bruce secured his first major record deal in a decade, with Epic, and recorded A Question of Time. This included two tracks with Ginger Baker on drums, their first collaboration since Cream. Baker then joined Bruce's live band and toured the United States at the turn of the decade.

1990s
Bruce played at the Montreux Jazz Festival in 1990, and was invited by the Irish blues rock performer Rory Gallagher (who had a long-standing relationship with Bruce, having supported Cream's farewell concert in the band Taste in 1968) to perform a couple of songs together on stage. In 1991 he was one of the supporting musicians for Vivian Stanshall's solo show "Rawlinson Dog-ends", but quit over a lack of adequate rehearsals.

On April 25, 1991, Bruce performed with Uli Jon Roth, Simon Phillips, Randy Hansen, John Wetton, Zeno Roth, and others at E-Werk in Cologne, Germany.  This performance featured a tribute to Jimi Hendrix, and a concert video of 22 tracks was released on Laserdisc in 1994 as "The Spirit of Jimi Hendrix Live in Concert" in Japan.

In 1993, a solo album, Somethin Els, reunited him with Eric Clapton and brought belated, but widespread, critical acclaim.

Later that year, Ginger Baker and a host of former Bruce band colleagues joined him for two special 50th birthdays concerts in Cologne, Germany, hosted by the TV show Rockpalast. Selections from these were released as the live double CD Cities of the Heart, and much later as the DVD set Rockpalast: The 50th Birthdays Concerts. One special guest was the Irish blues-rock guitarist Gary Moore, who joined Bruce and Baker for a set of Cream classics. Inspired by this performance, the three formed the power trio BBM and their subsequent (and only) album, Around the Next Dream, was a top ten hit in the UK. However, the old arguments between Bruce and Baker arose again, and the subsequent tour was cut short and the band broke up. A low-key solo album, Monkjack, followed in 1995, featuring Bruce on piano and vocals, accompanied only by the Funkadelic organist Bernie Worrell.

Bruce then began work producing and arranging the soundtrack to the independently produced Scottish film The Slab Boys, with; Lulu, Edwyn Collins, Eddi Reader and the Proclaimers. The soundtrack album appeared in 1997. In 1997 he returned to touring as a member of Ringo Starr's All-Starr Band, which also featured Peter Frampton on guitar. At the gig in Denver, Colorado, the band was joined onstage by Ginger Baker, and Bruce, Baker and Frampton played a short set of Cream classics. Bruce continued to tour with Starr through 2000.

2000s

In 2001, Bruce reappeared with a band featuring Bernie Worrell, Vernon Reid of Living Colour on guitar and Kip Hanrahan's three-piece Latin rhythm section. Hanrahan also produced the accompanying album Shadows in the Air, which included a reunion with Eric Clapton on a new version of "Sunshine of Your Love". The band released another Hanrahan produced studio album, More Jack than God, in 2003, and a live DVD, Live at the Canterbury Fayre.

Bruce had suffered a period of declining health, after many years of addictions which he finally beat with clinical treatment, and in 2003 was diagnosed with liver cancer. In September 2003, he underwent a liver transplant, which was almost fatal, as his body initially rejected the new organ. He recovered, and in 2004 re-appeared to perform "Sunshine of Your Love" at a Rock Legends concert in Germany organised by the singer Mandoki.

In May 2005, he reunited with former Cream bandmates Clapton and Baker for a series of well-received concerts at London's Royal Albert Hall, released as the album Royal Albert Hall London May 2-3-5-6, 2005, and New York's Madison Square Garden.

In between the UK and U.S. Cream dates, he also played live with Gary Moore and drummer Gary Husband at the Dick Heckstall-Smith tribute concert in London.

Subsequent concert appearances by Bruce were sparse because of recovery after the transplant, but in 2006 he returned to the live arena with a show of Cream and solo classics performed with the German HR (Hessischer Rundfunk) Big Band. This was released on CD in Germany in 2007. In 2007, he made a brief concert appearance, opening a new rehearsal hall named in his honour at the Royal Scottish Academy of Music and Drama, Glasgow with Clem Clempson, keyboard player Ronnie Leahy and Husband.

In 2008, Bruce collaborated again with guitarist Robin Trower on the album Seven Moons. It also featured Husband.

In May 2008, Bruce was 65 years old and to commemorate this milestone two box sets of recordings were released. Spirit is a three-CD collection of Bruce's BBC recordings from the 1970s. Can You Follow? is a six-CD retrospective anthology released by the Esoteric label in the UK. This anthology is a wide-ranging collection covering his music from 1963 to 2003 and, aside from his work with Kip Hanrahan, is a comprehensive overview of his career.

Improved health led to Bruce playing a series of live outdoor concerts across the US starting in July 2008 as part of the Hippiefest Tour. He was supported by members of the late Who bassist John Entwistle's the John Entwistle Band, and headlined at a tribute concert to the bassist.

In November 2008, he recorded a concert in Birmingham, England for Radio Broadcast with the BBC Big Band, where he again played the Big Band arrangements of his classic songs. In December he was reunited with Ginger Baker at the drummer's Lifetime Achievement Award concert in London. They played jazz classics with saxophonist Courtney Pine and for the first time in 40 years played the Graham Bond–Cream classic "Traintime".

The same month, Bruce, with guitarist Vernon Reid, drummer Cindy Blackman and organist John Medeski played a series of Blue Note Club tribute concerts to the Tony Williams Lifetime in Japan. These shows were broadcast in high definition on television in Japan.

In 2009, Bruce performed in a series of concerts with Trower and Husband in Europe. Proposed dates in the U.S. in April were cancelled because of a further bout of ill health. Bruce recovered and the band played summer concerts in Italy, Norway and the UK during 2009. This promoted the release of the Seven Moons live CD and DVD, recorded in February during the European leg of the tour in Nijmegen, Netherlands.

During the Scottish dates of the 2009 tour Bruce was presented with an Honorary Doctorate of Letters from Glasgow Caledonian University for services to the culture of Glasgow and music in general.

In August 2009, the 1983 Bruce solo album Automatic was re-released, making his entire solo catalogue available on CD. In addition, all of the discs up to and including How's Tricks contain previously unreleased material.

In October 2009, Bruce performed at the 50th anniversary of Ronnie Scott's Club with the Ronnie Scott's Blues Band.

2010s
Jack Bruce – Composing Himself: The Authorized Biography by Harry Shapiro was released by Jawbone Press in February 2010. Shapiro had previously written biographies of Bruce collaborators Alexis Korner, Graham Bond and Eric Clapton. The book followed memoirs from his Cream bandmates Clapton (Clapton, 2007) and Baker (Hellraiser, 2009). His songwriting partner, Pete Brown's, biography White Rooms & Imaginary Westerns was published in September 2010. They each have differing recollections of forming Cream, playing and writing together.

On 14 January, at the 2011 North American Music Merchants Show, Bruce became only the third recipient of the International Bassist Award, a lifetime achievement award for bassists, after Jaco Pastorius and Nathan Watts.

His first independent CD release, Live at the Milky Way, Amsterdam 2001, featuring The Cuicoland Express, his Latin-based band of the time, was issued in October 2010. The double album received an official worldwide release, distributed by EMI in February 2011. To support this release Bruce again played four dates in London at Ronnie Scott's Jazz Club with the Ronnie Scott's Blues Experience, followed by a further ten dates across the UK with the band. On 4 June 2011, Bruce played a special concert at the Royal Festival Hall in London, which was celebrating its 60th anniversary. The evening celebrated the 50th anniversary of the blues in Great Britain, and Bruce played with his Big Blues Band and special guest Joe Bonamassa.

Bruce started 2012 playing the Gerry Rafferty tribute concert in Glasgow, followed by a date with the traditional Celtic band Lau. BBC Scotland recorded a one-hour special on Bruce, which also included a performance with Lau. The completed documentary Jack Bruce – The Man behind the Bass was transmitted in February 2012 by BBC Scotland. It featured new interviews with Bruce, Clapton, Baker and Brown. It was transmitted again on 9 November 2014 on BBC2 Scotland and on 17 November 2014 on BBC4 in the UK.

February 2012 saw Bruce playing in Havana, Cuba, along with guitarist Phil Manzanera, supporting the mambo band of Augusto Enriquez. March saw another residency at Ronnie Scott's in London supported by his Big Blues Band, followed by a UK tour. The concert at the Stables, Milton Keynes on 18 March was due to be recorded as an Instant Live CD release, but technical issues prevented this. The following evenings' performance at the same location was recorded and a 2CD version issued by Instant Live.

Spectrum Road, a collaboration with Vernon Reid, Cindy Blackman and John Medeski in tribute to The Tony Williams Lifetime, was released in June 2012 by the US jazz record label Palmetto Records and was accompanied by a series of dates at large jazz festivals in North America and Europe throughout June and July.

In March 2014, Bruce released Silver Rails on the Esoteric Antenna label, his first solo studio album in over a decade. Silver Rails was recorded at Abbey Road Studios in London, produced and mixed by Rob Cass and features contributions from Cream lyricist, Pete Brown, Kip Hanrahan and wife Margrit Seyffer as well as musicians Robin Trower, Cindy Blackman, Phil Manzanera, Uli Jon Roth, John Medeski and Bernie Marsden. The deluxe version of the album featured a behind the scenes documentary "The Making of Silver Rails" which was filmed on location at the studios and directed by Bruce's daughter Kyla Simone Bruce. Bruce's son Malcolm Bruce pre-produced the album and played guitar on several tracks, while Bruce's daughter Aruba Red was featured on "Hidden Cities" singing backing vocals.

Personal life
In 1964, Bruce married Janet Godfrey, who had been the secretary of the Graham Bond Organisation fan club and had collaborated with Bruce on two songs written for the band. The couple had two sons together, Jonas (Jo) Bruce, who grew up to play keyboards in his father's band and played with Afro Celt Sound System, and Malcolm Bruce, who grew up to play the guitar with his father and played with Ginger Baker's son, Kofi. Jonas died in 1997 from respiratory problems.

In 1982, he married his second wife, Margrit Seyffer, with whom he had two daughters, Natascha, known professionally as Aruba Red and Kyla, and a son, Corin.

Death
 
Bruce died of liver disease on 25 October 2014, in Sudbury, Suffolk, England, aged 71. He was survived by his wife Margrit and four children.

His funeral was held in London on 5 November 2014 and was attended by Clapton, Baker and noted musicians Phil Manzanera, Gary Brooker, Vernon Reid and Nitin Sawhney among others. Dozens assembled at the Golders Green Crematorium paying a last tribute singing "Morning Has Broken", "Strawberry Fields Forever" and "Theme for an Imaginary Western". Bruce's remains were later cremated and then interred at a private family ceremony on 31 December 2014 at the crematorium.

Influence
Steve Anderson, writing in The Independent said: "he became one of the most famous and influential bass players in rock." Eric Clapton posted on Facebook about Bruce: "He was a great musician and composer, and a tremendous inspiration to me" and composed an acoustic song in his honour. Black Sabbath guitarist Tony Iommi said on Twitter that Bruce had been his favourite bass player, saying "He was a hero to so many" and Black Sabbath bassist Geezer Butler regarded him as his "biggest influence and favourite bass player". Rush bassist and singer Geddy Lee wrote: "One of the greatest rock bassists to ever live and a true and profound inspiration to countless musicians. He was one of my first bass heroes and was a major influence on my playing and my music."

Writing in The Sunday Times in 2008, Dan Cairns had suggested: "many consider him to be one of the greatest bass players of all time." Writing in The Daily Telegraph, Neil McCormick said, "There was a time when Jack Bruce was synonymous with the bass guitar in rock history, when he was widely revered as the best there was on four strings." Roger Waters of Pink Floyd described Bruce as "probably the most musically gifted bass player who's ever been."

Discography

Singles
1965, "I'm Gettin' Tired (Of Drinkin' and Gamblin')", Polydor: BM 56036
1971, "The Consul at Sunset" / "A Letter of Thanks", Polydor: 2058 153
1974, "Keep It Down", RSO: 2090 141
1986, "Feel Free", Virgin: VS 875
1995, "Monkjack", CMP Records:	CMP CD 1010P
1997, "On and On" (Man Doki with Ian Anderson, Nik Kershaw, Jack Bruce, Bobby Kimball, Chaka Khan, Guru and David Clayton-Thomas), Brunswick News: 573 469-2
2014, "Fields of Forever", Esoteric / Cherry Red: EANTS 1002

Studio albums

Live albums

Compilations

DVDs

Collaborations
with Alexis Korner's Blues Incorporated
 1964 – Alexis Korner and Friends

with The Graham Bond Organisation
 1964 – Live at Klooks Kleek (first released in 1972 as Faces And Places Vol. 4)
 1965 – The Sound of '65
 1965 – There's A Bond Between Us

with John Mayall & the Bluesbreakers
 1966 – Looking Back (compilation album released in 1969)
 1966 – Primal Solos (live recording first released in 1977)

with Manfred Mann
 1966 – "Pretty Flamingo", Machines EP, Instrumental Asylum EP

with Cream
 1966 – Fresh Cream
 1967 – Disraeli Gears
 1968 – Wheels of Fire
 1969 – Goodbye
 1970 – Live Cream
 1972 – Live Cream Volume II
 2005 – Royal Albert Hall London May 2-3-5-6, 2005

with Jimi Hendrix
 1968 – Jack Bruce Jam (Unofficial Release)

 with Michael Gibbs
 1970 – Michael Gibbs

with The Tony Williams Lifetime
 1970 – Turn It Over
 1971 – Ego

with Carla Bley
 1971 – Escalator over the Hill

with West, Bruce and Laing
 1972 – Why Dontcha
 1973 – Whatever Turns You On
 1974 – Live 'n' Kickin'

with Lou Reed
 1973 – Berlin

with Frank Zappa
 1974 – Apostrophe (')

with Michael Mantler
 1974 – No Answer
 1987 – Live
 1988 – Many Have No Speech
 1993 – Folly Seeing All This
 1997 – The School of Understanding

with Charlie Mariano
 1976 – Helen 12 Trees

with John McLaughlin
 1978 – Electric Guitarist

with Cozy Powell
 1979 – Over the Top
 1981 – Tilt

with Bernie Marsden
 1979 – And About Time Too

with Trevor Rabin
 1980 – Wolf

with Rocket 88
 1981 – Rocket 88

with Soft Machine
 1981 – Land of Cockayne

with Robin Trower
 1981 – B.L.T. (album)  – US#37
 1982 – Truce  – US#109 CA#39
 2008 – Seven Moons
 2009 – Seven Moons Live (re-released as Songs From The Road)

with Ellen McIlwaine
 1982 –  Everybody Needs It

with Mose Allison
 1983 – Lessons in Living

with Allan Holdsworth
 1983 – Road Games

with Kip Hanrahan
 1983 – Desire Develops an Edge
 1984 – Vertical's Currency
 1986 – A Few Short Notes from the End Run
 1993 – Exotica
 1995 – All Roads Are Made of the Flesh

with Mark Nauseef
 1985 – Wun-Wun
 1994 – The Snake Music (with Miroslav Tadić)

with The Golden Palominos
 1985 – Visions of Excess
 1986 – Blast of Silence (Axed My Baby for a Nickel)

with Anton Fier and Kenji Suzuki
 1987 – Inazuma Super Session "Absolute Live!!"

with Leslie West
 1988 – Theme

with Bill Ward
1990 – Ward One: Along the Way

with Bruce-Baker-Moore (BBM)
 1994 – Around The Next Dream

with Dick Heckstall-Smith and John Stevens
 1994 – This That

 with Vernon Reid, Cindy Blackman and John Medeski
 2012 – Spectrum Road

References

External links

 
 Original Smiles & Grins Jack Bruce Club
 

1943 births
2014 deaths
20th-century Scottish male musicians
21st-century Scottish male musicians
Scottish jazz bass guitarists
British blues singers
Alumni of the Royal Conservatoire of Scotland
20th-century Scottish male singers
Scottish rock singers
Scottish jazz double-bassists
Male double-bassists
Scottish heavy metal bass guitarists
Scottish multi-instrumentalists
Scottish diarists
People from Bishopbriggs
Manfred Mann members
John Mayall & the Bluesbreakers members
Cream (band) members
The Golden Palominos members
Polydor Records artists
British rhythm and blues boom musicians
People educated at Bellahouston Academy
Rock double-bassists
Atco Records artists
RSO Records artists
Liver transplant recipients
Deaths from liver disease
Scottish songwriters
EMI Records artists
20th-century bass guitarists
21st-century bass guitarists
West, Bruce and Laing members
Blues Incorporated members
The Graham Bond Organisation members
The Tony Williams Lifetime members
Male bass guitarists
British male jazz musicians
Eric Clapton and the Powerhouse members
Bruce-Baker-Moore members
New Jazz Orchestra members
Ringo Starr & His All-Starr Band members